= Furniture preservation =

Practice of maintaining the condition of furniture

Furniture preservation is the practice of maintaining the condition of furniture, especially antique or valuable wooden furniture. One of the most significant dangers to wooden furniture is humidity; wood will tend to expand by absorbing water from the air when it is humid, and shrink when the air is drier. This can result in all kinds of damage to the furniture, especially if it has boards which are held in place and cannot move freely (e.g., because they interlock with each other), in which case the boards may degrade, either through compression or by splitting apart. Damage of this kind can be avoided by maintaining consistent relative humidity in the area where the furniture in question is being kept. High relative humidity can even result in mold or insect infestations in wooden furniture. Avoiding exposure to direct sunlight is also important to furniture preservation, as direct sunlight can fade wood or upholstery over time.
